Drummond Street is a street in London just north of the centre, located near Euston station and running parallel with Euston Road. It is best known for its Indian and Bangladeshi restaurants and supply shops, including Diwana Bhel Poori House which claims to be the oldest South Indian vegetarian restaurant in Britain, having opened in 1970.

It is the site of Schafer House, a student hall of residence of University College London.

Drummond Street used to be considerably longer, continuing north-eastwards through what is now Euston station and also including what is now Doric Way. On this part of Drummond Street was the main entrance to the station and the site of the Euston Arch. The eastern part of Drummond Street was built over when Euston station was rebuilt and extended southwards in 1961; the Euston Arch was demolished, the far north-eastern part of Drummond Street was renamed Doric Way, and Drummond Street was separated from the formerly-adjacent Drummond Crescent to the north.

Drummond Street will be further encroached upon by the future development of Euston station for the High Speed 2 proposal.

The Crown and Anchor is a Grade II listed public house at 137 Drummond Street.

In June 2021, an enterprise called the "Drummond Streatery project" was launched to help revive the street's restaurant trade after the disruption caused by the COVID-19 pandemic and the engineering works at the nearby station. The project is a collaboration between Camden London Borough Council and the local business improvement district team, with the involvement of local traders.

References

Streets in the London Borough of Camden